Helgi Björnsson (born 10 July 1958), often referred to as Helgi Björns, is an Icelandic actor and pop/rock musician. He has released several albums with his own band Helgi Björns Og Reiðmenn Vindanna. He was also a lead vocalist for the Icelandic bands Grafík and for Síðan skein sól (also known as SSSól). 

Helgi was born in Ísafjörður. As an actor, he has appeared in films such as Hitler's Grave by Daryush Shokof in 2011.

Discography

Albums
Solo
1997: Helgi Björns
2005: Yfir Esjuna
2011: ...syngur íslenskar dægurperlur ásamt gestum
2014: Eru ekki allir sexý? (compilation)
2015: Veröldin er ný
2018: Ég stoppa hnöttinn með puttanum

as Helgi Björns og Reiðmenn Vindanna
2008: Ríðum sem fjandinn
2010: Þú komst í hlaðið
2011: Ég vil fara upp í sveit

in Grafík
1984: Get ég tekið cjens
1985: Stansað Dansað Öskrað

with Síðan skein sól / SSSól 
1989: Síðan Skein Sól
1989: Ég stend á skýi
1990: Halló ég elska þig
1991: Klikkað
1992: Toppurinn
1993: SSSól
1994: Blóð
1999: 88-99

Singles
2014: "Viltu dansa?"
2014: "Ég fer á Land Rover frá Mývatni á Kópasker"
2019: "Það bera sig allir vel"

Filmography

Film
1984: Atómstöðin as Arngrímur Árland	
1987: Skytturnar (English title White Whales) as a billiard player
1988: Foxtrot as a mechanics	
1992: Sódóma Reykjavík (English title Remote Control) as Moli	
1993: Í ljósaskiptunum		
1999: Ungfrúin góða og húsið (English title The Honour of the House) as Andrés	
2000: Óskabörn þjóðarinnar		
2001: Villiljós as Vikki	
2001: Skrímsli (English title No Such Thing) as Leó	
2004: Njálssaga as Otkell	
2005: Strákarnir okkar (English title Eleven Men Out) as Pétur
2005: Beowulf & Grendel (Icelandic title Bjólfskviða) as Maður
2006: Köld slóð (English title Cold Trail) as Karl
2009: Reykjavik Whale Watching Massacre
2011: Hitler's Grave
2012: Frost as Yfirmaður Björgunarsveitar
2013: Hross í oss
2014: París Norðursins
2016: Grimmd

Television
2008: Svartir englar
2011: Makalaus
2016: Ligeglad
2016: Der Island-Krimi

Personal life
Helgi is the son of María Gísladóttir and Björn Helgason, a former member of the Icelandic men's national football team.

References

External links
 

Living people
1958 births
Helgi Björnsson
Helgi Björnsson
Helgi Björnsson
Helgi Björnsson
Helgi Bjornsson
21st-century Icelandic male singers